Jivabhai Ambalal Patel (born 30 April 1938) is chairman of the Gujarat Mineral Development Corporation, and an Indian politician. He was a member of the 14th Lok Sabha, representing the Mahesana parliamentary constituency of Gujarat from 2004 to 2009. He was defeated in 2009 and 2014 Indian general election and 2017 Gujarat Legislative Assembly election. He left INC and joined Bharatiya Janata Party (BJP) in September 2018.

References

External links
 Official biographical sketch in Parliament of India website

1938 births
Living people
People from Gujarat
Indian National Congress politicians
India MPs 2004–2009
People from Mehsana district
United Progressive Alliance candidates in the 2014 Indian general election
Lok Sabha members from Gujarat
Indian National Congress politicians from Gujarat
Bharatiya Janata Party politicians from Gujarat
Former members of Indian National Congress from Gujarat